José Manuel Guerreiro Santana (born May 17, 1957, in Lisbon) is a Portuguese karateka, twice world champion in kumite.

Biography 
José Santana began practicing martial arts at the age of fourteen with Shotokan Karate teacher Luís Cunha at Ginásio Clube Português (GCP), in Lisbon. Invited by a friend, he began training of Goju-ryu Seigokan at the Budo School in Sapadores, created by Mitsuharu Tsuchiya. He immediately joined this traditional style of karatedo, when he watched the performance of Sanchin kata by Katsumune Nagai (4th Dan), 4-time Seigokan Champion in Inter-State Championships in Japan. 

He also practices Boxing, having been National Champion in his category for two consecutive years and been selected for the Olympic Games in Moscow in 1980. Following the return of Nagai to Japan, and after the temporary interruption of the practice of this style in Portugal, he practiced Taekwondo at Sporting Clube de Portugal with Chung Sun Yong (9th Dan), also being national champion in this modality. He travelled to Japan five times and to Macau several times, where he met Kata World Champion Atsuko Wakai, also from Seigokan, to participate in seminars, championships and to take his Dan grading tests at Hombu Dojo of Seigokan, in the city of Himeji, Japan.

In 1998, he became Seigokan Karate World Champion in Kumite and World Vice-Champion in Kata, a feat he would repeat in 2004 when he again became Seigokan's World Champion in Kumite. 2008 marked a new stage in the martial career of this Lusitanian Master, when he graduated in 6th Dan with the attribution of the title of Shihan and was named Chief Instructor of Seigokan for Portugal and Europe. This was a great honour, since it is usually a charge played by Japanese Masters.

In 2012, he was appointed by the Seigokan Japanese Masters collective at the annual meeting at Hombu Dojo in Himeji, a full member of the Nippon Seigokan Board of Directors, and the corresponding Diploma was sent to him.
In July 2017, in an examination held at the Budokan in Himeji, Japan, under the supervision of a jury composed of several Grand Masters of Seigokan, graduated above 8th Dan, he obtained the 7th Dan grade with distinction .

Bibliography 
 "Seigokan Portugal (Genesis) - Photo Album" by AKSP. CreateSpace Edition (2017); 
 "História da Seigokan em Portugal" by Eduardo Lopes. Bubok Edition (2015); 
 "Karate-do Seigokan em Macau - UMA LONGA HISTÓRIA DE SUCESSOS". CreateSpace Publishing (2017);

Press 
 "Destak" Newspaper
 "Cinturão Negro n.172" Magazine
 "Cinturão Negro n.181" Magazine
 "Ripa Desporto" Newspaper
 "Sem Mais" Newspaper

References

External links 
Portugal Seigokan AKSP 
Seigokan Hombu Dojo 
Atsuko Wakai Official Website 

1957 births
Portuguese male karateka
Gōjū-ryū practitioners
Karate coaches
Portuguese male boxers
Living people
Sportspeople from Lisbon